Obadiah Moyo is a Zimbabwean politician and former hospital administrator. In 2018, he was appointed the country's Minister of Health and Child Care. On 19 June 2020, he was arrested and charged with three counts of criminal abuse of duty as a public officer, for his alleged participation in a scam that involved tens of millions of dollars. After spending the night in police cells, he posted $50,000.00 bail. On 7 July 2020, the President of Zimbabwe, Emmerson Mnangagwa dismissed Moyo from the office of cabinet minister, removing him for "conduct inappropriate for a Government Minister".

Previous career
Moyo served as the Executive Director of The Zimbabwe Kidney Fund Association's Renal Services and worked to bring more dialysis machines to hospitals. Moyo was involved in providing dialysis care for Sally Mugabe, Robert Mugabe's first wife, when she battled renal disease.

In 2005, he was appointed as the chief executive officer of Chitungwiza Central Hospital near Harare. He held the position until 2018.

Political career
Moyo is a member of Zanu-PF. He ran for parliament in 2018 in the Zengeza East constituency but lost the election to Goodrich Chimbaira.

He had previously run for election in 2005 as the representative for Nkayi but was not successful.

Moyo was appointed as the Minister of Health and Child Care in September 2018 in Emmerson Mnangagwa's government. He replaced David Parirenyatwa. During his first year in the ministerial role, the country faced a cholera outbreak and doctor strikes over hospital conditions, a shortage of drugs and wages. In March 2020, Moyo was appointed to lead the country's Coronavirus Task Force. Moyo's tenure as Zimbabwe's Minister of Health was marred by frequent and persistent complaints that he is an academic imposter; that he faked his medical qualifications; and that he is not, as he claims to be, a medical doctor.

In June 2020, Moyo was arrested for corruption and abuse of office. He was charged with illegally awarding $60 million in contracts, through the Health Ministry, without a competitive tender process to purchase COVID-19 testing materials and equipment. Moyo was removed from office on 7 July 2020.

Personal life
Moyo was born in Gutu. As a young man he was known in local pubs  as  DJ The Mighty Biscuit. He married Lucy Memory. They have four children together.

References

Year of birth missing (living people)
Living people
Government ministers of Zimbabwe
Members of the National Assembly of Zimbabwe
ZANU–PF politicians